The South African Railways Class 6E 4-6-0 of 1898 was a steam locomotive from the pre-Union era in the Orange Free State.

In 1898, the Oranje-Vrijstaat Gouwerment-Spoorwegen ordered its final six new Cape 6th Class locomotives. When British forces invaded the Orange Free State during the Second Boer War, these locomotives were taken over by the Imperial Military Railways. After the war, they were renumbered into the Central South African Railways roster. In 1912, when they were assimilated into the South African Railways, they were renumbered and designated .

Manufacturer
The original 6th Class  passenger steam locomotive was designed at the Salt River works of the Cape Government Railways (CGR) at the same time as the 7th Class, both according to the specifications of Michael Stephens, then the Chief Locomotive Superintendent of the CGR, and under the supervision of H.M. Beatty, then the Locomotive Superintendent of the Cape Western System.

The first ten 6th Class L locomotives of the Oranje-Vrijstaat Gouwerment-Spoorwegen (OVGS) were purchased second-hand from the CGR. These were followed by orders for 24 new 6th Class L2 locomotives, directly from the manufacturers, which were delivered between 1895 and 1898.

A final order for six more locomotives was placed with Sharp, Stewart and Company in 1898. Three of these engines, designated 6th Class L3, had been delivered and numbered in the range from 96 to 98 on the OVGS roster, when British forces invaded the Orange Free State during the Second Boer War and the OVGS was taken over by the Imperial Military Railways (IMR). When the other three locomotives arrived, they were therefore numbered in the range from 370 to 372 on the IMR roster.

These six locomotives were delivered with larger cabs than their predecessors and with Type XC1 bogie-wheeled tenders. The first three engines retained their OVGS numbers until the war ended in 1902, when they were renumbered onto the Central South African Railways (CSAR) roster. The other three locomotives retained their IMR running numbers on the CSAR and all six were designated CSAR .

Class 6 sub-classes
When the Union of South Africa was established on 31 May 1910, the three Colonial government railways (CGR, Natal Government Railways and CSAR) were united under a single administration to control and administer the railways, ports and harbours of the Union. Although the South African Railways and Harbours came into existence in 1910, the actual classification and renumbering of all the rolling stock of the three constituent railways were only implemented with effect from 1 January 1912.

When these six locomotives were assimilated into the South African Railways (SAR) in 1912, they were designated Class 6E and renumbered in the range from 598 to 603. These engines, together with the CGR's fleet of various types of 6th Class locomotives and the Class 6-L1 and 6-L2 locomotives which had been inherited by the CSAR from the OVGS via the IMR, were grouped into altogether fourteen sub-classes by the SAR. The  locomotives became SAR Classes 6, 6A to 6H and 6J to 6L, the  locomotives became Class 6Y and the  locomotives became Class 6Z.

Modifications
P.A. Hyde, the Chief Locomotive Superintendent of the CSAR from 1902 to 1904, considered the 6th Class as "about the best design for their weight ever made". Several of the CSAR's Classes 6-L1 to 6-L3 locomotives were modified by Hyde by having their round-topped fireboxes replaced with larger boilers and Belpaire fireboxes. This conversion improved their performance tremendously, to the extent that they could be used in place of the 8th Class where they were formerly outclassed by load. This represented an increase in hauling capacity of some 12%, while their coal consumption was reduced by some 5%. The three Class 6E locomotives which were renumbered in the SAR range from 601 to 603, had undergone this modification.

During the 1930s, many of them were modified once again, when the Chief Mechanical Engineer of the SAR at the time, A.G. Watson, embarked on his program of standardisation and reboilered them with round-topped fireboxes once again, but without changing their classification.

Renumbering
The Class 6E locomotives were renumbered twice, first from the OVGS and IMR rosters onto the CSAR roster and, in 1912, onto the SAR roster. The table lists their renumbering as well as their builder's works numbers.

References

1360
1360
4-6-0 locomotives
2′C n2 locomotives
Sharp Stewart locomotives
Cape gauge railway locomotives
Railway locomotives introduced in 1898
1898 in South Africa
Scrapped locomotives